Kyzyl-Yar (Qıźılyar) is a rural locality (a selo) in Kyzyl-Yarsky Selsoviet, Yermekeyevsky District, Bashkortostan, Russia. The population was 72 as of 2010. There is 1 street.

Geography 
Kyzyl-Yar is located 18 km northwest of Yermekeyevo (the district's administrative centre) by road. Kushkaran is the nearest rural locality.

References 

Rural localities in Yermekeyevsky District